The Bills–Dolphins rivalry is a National Football League (NFL) rivalry between the Buffalo Bills and Miami Dolphins. The teams, who are members of the AFC East, have played each other twice per year since the 1966 season. In the 114 regular season games between the teams in the series, the Dolphins lead 61–52–1 as of 2022. The teams have also met five times in the NFL playoffs. The Bills are 4–1 in the postseason, including a victory in the 1992 AFC Championship Game.

The rivalry was once lopsided as the Dolphins, one of the league's best teams after Don Shula took over as head coach in the 1970s, amassed 20 consecutive wins over the Bills in that decade. It later became more competitive in the 1980s as Buffalo emerged as a leading team in the AFC alongside Miami. During the 1990s, the teams faced off four different times in the AFC playoffs, and the period featured Hall of Fame quarterbacks Jim Kelly for Buffalo and Dan Marino for Miami. Though both teams fell short of the same level of success in the 2000s and 2010s after the retirements of Shula, Kelly, Marino, and Bills coach Marv Levy, the Bills and Dolphins remain rivals. The rivalry showed signs of becoming more intense again in 2020 when both clubs fought for playoff berths, with the Bills ultimately winning the division that year.

History

1966–69: The AFL days
After Miami joined the American Football League (AFL) for the 1966 season, it played against Buffalo for the first time on September 18. The host Bills posted 48 points in the first half of the game, and won 58–24. In the second game between the teams, and the first to be played in Miami, the Bills shut out the Dolphins 29–0. The following year, Miami defeated Buffalo for the first time; a late 31-yard Bob Griese touchdown pass to Howard Twilley gave the Dolphins a 17–14 win. In 1968, the teams played to a 14–14 tie, the only one in the rivalry. After two consecutive Dolphins victories, the Bills won the teams' second game in 1969, 28–3. The game, which featured two receiving touchdowns by O. J. Simpson, proved to be their last win in the series for 11 years.

1970–79: Complete dominance by Miami
Following the 1969 season, the AFL and NFL completed the AFL–NFL merger by re-aligning the NFL's divisions. The Bills and Dolphins joined the NFL's new AFC East division, guaranteeing that they would play twice per year, once at each team's home stadium. In the 1970s, Miami won all 20 meetings between the teams; 12 of the victories came by 10 or more points. Under head coach Don Shula, the Dolphins became a league power during the decade, appearing in the Super Bowl three times and winning two championships. One of the most notable Bills–Dolphins games of this period came in 1972, the year the Dolphins completed an undefeated season. The closest game by final score that Miami played during the season was its first game against the Bills, a 24–23 Dolphins win in the Miami Orange Bowl. Two years later, the Orange Bowl hosted a contest that Chris Iorfida of CBC Sports later called "A rare competitive game between the clubs during the mid- to late-1970s, and an exciting one." The Dolphins held a 28–21 lead when Bills reserve quarterback Gary Marangi passed for the tying touchdown in the final minute of the game. Miami responded 37 seconds later with a 23-yard Don Nottingham run for the touchdown that gave the team a 35–28 win.

By November 1978, the Dolphins' winning streak in the series had reached 17 games, a mark tied for the longest streak in NFL history for one team against another. The press in the Buffalo area frequently noted this fact. The Dolphins broke the record with a 25–24 result in Buffalo's Rich Stadium on November 12 of that year. With 9–7 and 17–7 victories in 1979, Miami's streak reached 20 by the end of the decade.

1980–89: Bills turn the corner and the emergence of Marino and Kelly
On September 7, 1980, the Bills recorded their first victory versus the Dolphins in 21 games, after failing to win a single game against them during the 1970s. With a pair of touchdowns in the final quarter, Buffalo won 17–7. After the conclusion, fans at Rich Stadium rushed the field in celebration, tearing down one of the goal posts in the process. In 1983, the Dolphins hosted the Bills in rookie Dan Marino's first NFL start. The Dolphins overcame a 14–0 gap to lead 35–28 in the final minute before Bills quarterback Joe Ferguson led a game-tying comeback. The game in the Miami Orange Bowl went to overtime, where Dolphins placekicker Uwe von Schamann was unsuccessful on two potential game-winning field goal attempts. The Bills won 38–35 when Joe Danelo made a 36-yard field goal attempt late in overtime; it was Buffalo's first road win in the rivalry for 17 years. Ferguson had 419 yards passing and five touchdowns in the game; the former set a franchise record. Other than those two contests, Miami won 11 of the other 12 games between the teams from 1980 to 1986. United Press International termed the matchup "one of pro football's most lopsided rivalries" in 1983. The Bills, however, won the series' last six games in the 1980s. The first of those came in October 1987, when the Bills won 34–31 in overtime after trailing the Dolphins 21–0 in the first half; the game featured six combined touchdown passes by the teams' quarterbacks, Marino of Miami and Jim Kelly of Buffalo. One of the final games between the Bills and Dolphins in the decade was a 1989 encounter in which Kelly ran two yards for a touchdown on the last play of the contest, giving the Bills a 27–24 victory.

1990–99: Fight for AFC supremacy

Most of the 1990s games between the teams featured the quarterback play of Marino and Kelly, who became key figures in the rivalry, and eventually earned induction into the Pro Football Hall of Fame. From 1986 to 1996, they had a total of 21 matchups, counting postseason games. In the 1990 playoffs, the Bills and Dolphins met for the first time in the postseason. Buffalo won the divisional round game, held at Rich Stadium, 44–34, as Kelly threw for three touchdowns. Two seasons later, the teams met again in the playoffs, this time in the AFC Championship Game. Players from both teams commented on the rivalry's intensity at the time; Richmond Webb, a Miami offensive lineman, said, "I don't know how it got started – it was a long time before I got here – but these two teams don't like each other. It's like the Game of the Year every time we play them." Before the Bills' last regular season game against the Houston Oilers, Miami safety Louis Oliver had shirts delivered to Oilers players, encouraging them to defeat the Bills; the Oilers did just that, winning 27–3 and allowing the Dolphins to finish first in the AFC East. In response, Bills running back Thurman Thomas said it was "typical of the Miami Dolphins ... to have someone else do their dirty work." A week later, the Oilers raced to a 35–3 lead but collapsed in a 41–38 loss to the Bills in the wild card playoff round, then on January 17, 1993 at Joe Robbie Stadium, the Bills defeated the Dolphins 29–10 to advance to their third consecutive Super Bowl.

The first game in the series in the 1993 season, in Rich Stadium, saw an incident where Miami linebacker Bryan Cox gestured at Bills fans, having previously said that he would "retire from football if I am ever traded up there." Multiple Dolphins players later said the spectators responded in a similar fashion towards them. After a 22–13 Dolphins victory over the Bills, sportswriter Bill Plaschke called the game "a considerable step toward making their rivalry the ugliest in the league". The teams met twice more in the playoffs during the 1990s. On December 30, 1995, Buffalo broke the league record for rushing yards in a game with 341, winning 37–22. This was Shula's last game in the NFL. Three seasons later, the teams met at Pro Player Stadium on January 2, 1999 for their fourth playoff game of the decade, which the Dolphins won 24–17 after forcing five Bills turnovers. In regular season games during the decade, the Bills held a 12–8 win–loss advantage. CBS Sports would later rank the Bills–Dolphins rivalry as the fifth-best NFL rivalry of the 1990s.

2000–09: Decline

When the NFL reshuffled its divisions after the Houston Texans joined, there was talk of the Bills moving to the AFC North, but Bills owner Ralph Wilson wanted to keep the Bills–Dolphins rivalry active, and thus, the Bills remained in the division. However, the rivalry declined sharply during the 2000s. The rise of the New England Patriots and their dominant reign over the AFC East took focus away from the rivalry. This decade was marked by the aftermath of the retirements of Kelly and Marino from the Bills and Dolphins, respectively. The Buffalo News later wrote that the rivalry had begun declining after the end of their careers. In addition, longtime Bills head coach Marv Levy, who had led the team during its run of success in the 1990s, had retired after the 1997 season. On the NFL's website, Nick Bakay attributed the decline to the reduced success of the Bills and Dolphins in the following years, as there were only three playoff appearances by either team in the 2000s, all by Miami, as the Bills missed the playoffs from 2000 to 2016. Each team won half of the 20 games in the series during the 2000s. In 2008, the Bills hosted Miami at the Rogers Centre in Toronto, Canada; it was the first time the country had been the site of a regular season NFL game. Miami won the contest 16–3.

2010–2019

The teams split their two contests in 2010, while the Dolphins won both of their 2011 matchups. The Bills then won 11 of the following 16 games, claiming a 12–8 advantage during the 2010s decade.

During the 2013 season, quarterback Thad Lewis started in place of injured Bills starter EJ Manuel for both of their games against the Dolphins. This was notable as Lewis had grown up in Miami. Coincidentally, the Bills won both games. The first game was marked by a late-game strip-sack of Dolphins quarterback Ryan Tannehill by Bills defender Mario Williams to set up the Bills' game-winning field goal, and the second was a 19–0 shutout by Buffalo.

During an October 23, 2016 match-up between the two teams, the Bills had a 17–6 lead at one point in the third quarter, but a career game from Miami running back Jay Ajayi helped the Dolphins to come back in the fourth quarter, winning 28–25. Ajayi became just the fourth running back in NFL history to rush for 200 yards in back-to-back games, as he had rushed for over 200 in the prior game against the Pittsburgh Steelers. The game also featured a hit on Bills safety Aaron Williams from Dolphins receiver Jarvis Landry that ended Williams' season and ultimately led to his retirement. On December 24, 2016, the Dolphins won their first game in Buffalo since 2011. The Dolphins won a close game 34–31 in overtime to move to 10–5 on the year and clinched a playoff berth for the first time since 2008 with a Denver Broncos loss the next day. Buffalo, on the other hand, was eliminated from the postseason with the loss despite posting a franchise record 589 yards of offense in a single game. Its defense allowed a 57-yard run from Ajayi in overtime with only 10 defenders on the field, which set up Miami's game-winning field goal. Shortly after the game, the Bills fired head coach Rex Ryan.

The Bills and Dolphins did not meet again until Week 15 in the 2017 season. During the game, which also carried playoff implications, Bills running back LeSean McCoy topped 10,000 career rushing yards, becoming just the 30th NFL running back to do so. Buffalo won 24–16 as Dolphins quarterback Jay Cutler threw three interceptions. Two weeks later, a fight ensued after a Dolphins touchdown in the fourth quarter that led to the ejections of Landry and his teammate Kenyan Drake. After staving off a Dolphins comeback, the Bills clinched their first playoff berth in 18 years with a win in Miami, along with a Cincinnati Bengals victory over the Baltimore Ravens.

On December 2, 2018, Bills tight end and former Dolphin Charles Clay dropped a potential game winning pass from rookie quarterback Josh Allen, allowing a 21–17 Dolphins victory in Miami Gardens. During the rematch on December 30, Dolphins linebacker and former Bill Kiko Alonso collided with a sliding Allen, which drew a penalty and led to another fight which saw Alonso and two other players ejected. The Bills won this game 42–17. The day after this game, Miami fired head coach Adam Gase. The Bills rounded out the 2010s decade with a season sweep in 2019, winning 31–21 in Buffalo on October 20 despite Miami staying competitive under former Bills quarterback Ryan Fitzpatrick, and 37–20 in Miami on November 17.

2020–present: Signs of a renewed rivalry
The Dolphins began the 2020s by hiring former Bills head coach Chan Gailey as offensive coordinator, a position he previously held with Miami from 2000–2001. The hiring also reunited Gailey with Ryan Fitzpatrick, who was the Bills' starting quarterback during Gailey's tenure with Buffalo. The first meeting between the two teams in the 2020s resulted in a 31–28 Bills victory in Miami on September 20, 2020, with Allen out-dueling Fitzpatrick with a career-high 417 passing yards and four touchdowns. Buffalo claimed the division crown later in the season. The Dolphins ultimately failed to clinch a playoff berth, losing 56–26 to the Bills in the regular season finale, and were eliminated when the Baltimore Ravens, Cleveland Browns, and Indianapolis Colts all won that week. With both teams in postseason contention, after a long period during which they rarely reached the playoffs, the Democrat and Chronicle'''s Sal Maiorana wrote that the rivalry had the potential to regain intensity.

In Week 2 of the 2021 season, the Bills won 35–0 in Miami behind a strong rushing attack and defensive performance as Allen surpassed 10,000 career passing yards in the game. The Dolphins surrendered 6 sacks to the Bills defense, also losing quarterback Tua Tagovailoa to a rib injury in the first quarter. The 35–0 win was the largest margin of victory by Buffalo in the series. With a 26–11 Bills home win on October 31, 2021, Buffalo achieved a team-record seventh straight victory in the series.

Following the 2021 season, the Dolphins fired their head coach, Brian Flores, and were in contention to hire Bills offensive coordinator Brian Daboll during their head coach search, before Daboll was hired by the New York Giants on January 28, 2022. Daboll had a past connection with Tagovailoa, whom Daboll previously coached in 2017 with the Alabama Crimson Tide. The Dolphins had also interviewed Bills defensive coordinator/assistant head coach Leslie Frazier for the vacant head coaching spot. The Dolphins eventually filled the vacant head coaching position with former San Francisco 49ers offensive coordinator Mike McDaniel. The Bills and Dolphins both made major moves during the 2022 offseason, with the Bills signing Super Bowl 50 MVP Von Miller to a 6-year, $120 million deal on March 16, 2022, and the Dolphins traded for star wide receiver Tyreek Hill on March 23. The Bills' seven-game winning streak in the series ended with a 21–19 Dolphins victory in the teams' first 2022 game. Despite Buffalo running 51 more plays than Miami, several miscues by the Bills offense led to stalled drives that were key to the Dolphins winning. The Dolphins were criticized for keeping Tagovailoa, who had apparently suffered a concussion, in the game, instead indicating that he had suffered a "back injury". The rematch that year on December 17 was an offensive shootout decided by a last-second field goal by the Bills' Tyler Bass as Buffalo won 32–29. In contrast to the Miami home game being played in hot, humid weather, the Buffalo home game was played in winter conditions with heavy lake-effect snow falling.

The two teams played their first postseason matchup since the 1998–99 playoffs on January 15, 2023, with Buffalo hosting a wild card matchup. Despite Tagovailoa being out of action and the Bills being heavily favored as a result, the Dolphins played the Bills tightly, even overcoming a 17–0 second quarter deficit and briefly taking the lead in the third quarter, but Buffalo held on to win 34–31 after overcoming several miscues.
 

Characteristics
Iorfida wrote in 2008 that the Bills and Dolphins had "one of the stranger rivalries in sports" due to the differences between Buffalo and Miami. In 1980, The Miami News Joe Crittenden referred to "the contrast between the two cities – Miami, the resort center in the subtropics and Buffalo, the snowfall capital of the east". He wrote that, when the Dolphins were building their 20-game winning streak in the 1970s, the differences contributed to the "intensity" of the rivalry. The CBC also noted the long distance between the teams' cities as an oddity. Despite this distance, they are both members of the AFC East, and have played at least two games per year since the Dolphins first joined the AFL. Games between the Bills and Dolphins were often significant in the league standings during the 1980s and 1990s, and Monday Night Football had nine games from the rivalry during the period.

The Bills–Dolphins rivalry has been called the most significant for Buffalo; Bakay, a Bills fan from the city, called Miami the Bills' "most hated divisional rival". In addition to their rivalry with the Bills, the Dolphins share one with the New York Jets, who "might be the most bitter foe for Miami", according to the CBC. Dolphins player Oliver offered a different assessment in 1993, saying "It's the biggest rivalry we have, us and Buffalo." In addition, both teams share rivalries with the New England Patriots.

Connections between the teams

Coaches/executives

Players

*Offseason and/or practice squad member only

Season-by-season results

|-
| 1966
| style="| | style="| Bills  58–24| style="| Bills  29–0| Bills  2–0
| Dolphins join AFL as an expansion team.
|-
| 1967
| Tie 1–1| style="| Bills  35–13| style="| Dolphins  17–14| Bills  3–1
| 
|-
| 1968
| style="| | style="| Dolphins  21–17| Tie  14–14| Bills  3–2–1
| Only tie in the history of the rivalry.
|-
| 1969
| Tie 1–1| style="| Bills  28–3| style="| Dolphins  24–6| Bills  4–3–1
|

|-
| 
| style="| | style="| Dolphins  33–14| style="| Dolphins  45–7| Dolphins  5–4–1
| AFL–NFL merger. Both teams placed in AFC East. 
|-
| 
| style="| | style="| Dolphins  29–14| style="| Dolphins  34–0| Dolphins  7–4–1
| Dolphins lose Super Bowl VI.
|-
| 
| style="| | style="| Dolphins  30–16| style="| Dolphins  24–23| Dolphins  9–4–1
| Dolphins complete 17–0 season, win Super Bowl VII.
|-
| 
| style="| | style="| Dolphins  17–0| style="| Dolphins  27–6| Dolphins  11–4–1
| Bills open New Era Field (then known as Rich Stadium). Dolphins win Super Bowl VIII.
|-
| 
| style="| | style="| Dolphins  24–16| style="| Dolphins  35–28| Dolphins  13–4–1
| 
|-
| 
| style="| | style="| Dolphins  35–30| style="| Dolphins  31–21| Dolphins  15–4–1
| 
|-
| 
| style="| | style="| Dolphins  30–21| style="| Dolphins  45–27| Dolphins  17–4–1
| 
|-
| 
| style="| | style="| Dolphins  13–0| style="| Dolphins  31–14| Dolphins  19–4–1
| 
|-
| 
| style="| | style="| Dolphins  25–24| style="| Dolphins  31–24| Dolphins  21–4–1
| 
|-
| 
| style="| | style="| Dolphins  9–7| style="| Dolphins  17–7| Dolphins  23–4–1
| Dolphins win 20 straight meetings.
|-

|-
| 
| Tie 1–1| style="| Bills  17–7| style="| Dolphins  17–14| Dolphins  24–5–1
| Bills win first game against Dolphins since the 1960s.
|-
| 
| Tie 1–1| style="| Bills  31–21| style="| Dolphins  16–6| Dolphins  25–6–1
| Game in Miami was the de facto AFC East Championship Game. Miami's victory clinched the AFC's #2 seed, while the Bills fell to the fifth-seeded wild card.
|-
| 
| style="| | style="| Dolphins  9–7| style="| Dolphins  27–10| Dolphins  27–6–1
| Both games are played despite players strike reducing season to 9 games. Dolphins win 14th straight home meeting. Dolphins lose Super Bowl XVII.
|-
| 
| Tie 1–1| style="| Dolphins  12–0| style="| Bills  38–35(OT)| Dolphins  28–7–1
| Bills win in Miami for first time since 1966. Jim Kelly and Dan Marino drafted as part of QB class of 1983
|-
| 
| style="| | style="| Dolphins  21–17| style="| Dolphins  38–7| Dolphins  30–7–1
| Dolphins lose Super Bowl XIX.
|-
| 
| style="| | style="| Dolphins  23–14| style="| Dolphins  28–0| Dolphins  32–7–1
| 
|-
| 
| style="| | style="| Dolphins  34–24| style="| Dolphins  27–14| Dolphins  34–7–1
| Dolphins win 31 of 34 meetings from 1970 to 1986. First meeting between Kelly and Marino as Kelly joins Bills after stint in the USFL.
|-
| 
| style="| | style="| Bills  27–0| style="| Bills  34–31(OT)| Dolphins  34–9–1
| Dolphins open Hard Rock Stadium (then known as Joe Robbie Stadium). Bills come back from down 21–0 to win in overtime in Miami.  Bills’ first season sweep since 1966.
|-
| 
| style="| | style="| Bills  9–6| style="| Bills  31–6| Dolphins  34–11–1
| 
|-
| 
| style="| | style="| Bills  31–17| style="| Bills  27–24| Dolphins  34–13–1
| Jim Kelly scrambles for Buffalo's game-winning touchdown during Miami home game as time expires.
|-

|-
| 
| Tie 1–1| style="| Bills  24–14| style="| Dolphins  30–7| Dolphins  35–14–1
| Bills lose Super Bowl XXV.
|- style="background:#f2f2f2; font-weight:bold;"
|  1990 Playoffs
| style="|  
| style="| Bills  44–34
|  
|  Dolphins  35–15–1
|  AFC Divisional playoffs: First postseason meeting.
|-
| 
| style="| | style="| Bills  35–31| style="| Bills  41–27| Dolphins  35–17–1
| Bills lose Super Bowl XXVI.
|-
| 
| Tie 1–1| style="| Dolphins  37–10| style="| Bills  26–20| Dolphins  36–18–1
| Bills lose Super Bowl XXVII.
|- style="background:#f2f2f2; font-weight:bold;"
|  1992 Playoffs
| style="|  
|  
| style="| Bills  29–10
|  Dolphins  36–19–1
|  AFC Championship Game.
|-
| 
| Tie 1–1| style="| Dolphins  22–13| style="| Bills  47–34| Dolphins  37–20–1
| Dolphins' Bryan Cox flips the bird to Bills fans. Bills lose Super Bowl XXVIII.
|-
| 
| style="| | style="| Bills  42–31| style="| Bills  21–11| Dolphins  37–22–1
|
|-
| 
| Tie 1–1| style="| Bills  23–20| style="| Dolphins  23–6| Dolphins  38–23–1
| Bills' Carwell Gardner and Dolphins' Bryan Cox ejected for fighting during game in Buffalo.
|- style="background:#f2f2f2; font-weight:bold;"
|  1995 Playoffs
| style="|   
| style="| Bills  37–22
|  
|  Dolphins  38–24–1
|  AFC Wild Card playoffs: Don Shula's final game as Dolphins' head coach.
|-
| 
| style="| | style="| Dolphins  21–7| style="| Dolphins  16–14| Dolphins  40–24–1
| Jim Kelly's last season
|-
| 
| Tie 1–1| style="| Bills  9–6| style="| Dolphins  30–13| Dolphins  41–25–1
| Marv Levy's last season as Bills' head coach.
|-
| 
| Tie 1–1| style="| Bills  30–24| style="| Dolphins  13–7| Dolphins  42–26–1
| 
|- style="background:#f2f2f2; font-weight:bold;"
|  1998 Playoffs
| style="| 
| 
| style="| Dolphins  24–17
|  Dolphins  43–26–1
|  AFC Wild Card playoffs.
|-
| 
| style="| | style="| Bills  30–24| style="| Bills  23–18| Dolphins  43–28–1
| Dan Marino's last season.
|-

|-
| 
| style="| | style="| Dolphins  33–6| style="| Dolphins  22–13| Dolphins  45–28–1
|
|-
| 
| style="| | style="| Dolphins  34–27| style="| Dolphins  34–7| Dolphins  47–28–1
| 
|-
| 
| style="| | style="| Bills  38–21| style="| Bills  23–10| Dolphins  47–30–1
| 
|-
| 
| style="| | style="| Dolphins  20–3| style="| Dolphins  17–7| Dolphins  49–30–1
| 
|-
| 
| style="| | style="| Bills  20–13| style="| Bills  42–32| Dolphins  49–32–1
| 
|-
| 
| Tie 1–1| style="| Bills  20–14| style="| Dolphins  24–23| Dolphins  50–33–1
| Bills squander 23–3 lead as Dolphins win 24–23 during game in Miami.
|-
| 
| style="| | style="| Bills  21–0| style="| Bills  16–6| Dolphins   50–35–1
| 
|-
| 
| style="| | style="| Bills  38–17| style="| Bills  13–10| Dolphins   50–37–1
| 
|-
| 
| style="| | style="| Dolphins  16–3| style="| Dolphins  25–16| Dolphins   52–37–1
| Bills' home game played at the Rogers Centre in Toronto as part of the Bills Toronto Series. 
|-
| 
| Tie 1–1| style="| Bills  31–14| style="| Dolphins  38–10| Dolphins  53–38–1
| 
|-

|-
| 
| Tie 1–1| style="| Dolphins  15–10| style="| Bills  17–14| Dolphins  54–39–1
| First time since 1993 that the road team wins both meetings.
|-
| 
| style="| | style="| Dolphins  30–23| style="| Dolphins  35–8| Dolphins  56–39–1
| 
|-
| 
| Tie 1–1| style="| Bills  19–14| style="| Dolphins  24–10| Dolphins  57–40–1
|
|-
| 
| style="| | style="| Bills  19–0| style="| Bills  23–21| Dolphins   57–42–1
| Mario Williams forces Ryan Tannehill to fumble, setting up Bills' game-winning FG during Miami home game.
|-
| 
| Tie 1–1| style="| Bills  29–10| style="| Dolphins  22–9| Dolphins  58–43–1
| 
|-
| 
| style="| | style="| Bills  33–17| style="| Bills  41–14| Dolphins   58–45–1
| 
|-
| 
| style="| | style="| Dolphins  34–31(OT)| style="| Dolphins  28–25| Dolphins  60–45–1
| Dolphins clinch playoff berth with overtime win in Buffalo despite Bills posting franchise record 589 yards in a game.
|-
| 
| style="| | style="| Bills  24–16| style="| Bills  22–16| Dolphins   60–47–1
| Bills win final game of the season in Miami to clinch first playoff berth since 1999 after Baltimore loses to Cincinnati.
|-
| 
| Tie 1–1| style="| Bills  42–17| style="| Dolphins  21–17| Dolphins  61–48–1
| Late hit on Josh Allen from Kiko Alonso leads to fight between teams in Buffalo.
|-
|-
| 
| style="| Bills 2–0| style="| Bills  31–21| style="| Bills  37–20| Dolphins  61–50–1
|

|-
| 
| style="|Bills 2–0| style="|Bills  56–26| style="| Bills  31–28| Dolphins  61–52–1
| Bills eliminate Dolphins from playoff contention in the home win in week 17 along with win by Indianapolis Colts. Bills sweep division for the first time in franchise history.
|-
| 
| style="|Bills 2–0| style="| Bills  26–11 
| style="| Bills  35–0| Dolphins  61–54–1
| Bills' win in Miami is the largest margin of victory by Buffalo in the series. Bills win seven straight meetings.
|-
| 
| Tie 1–1| style="| Bills  32–29 
| style="| Dolphins  21–19| Dolphins  62–55–1
| Bills clinch playoff berth with home win on a last-second field goal by Tyler Bass.
|- style="background:#f2f2f2; font-weight:bold;"
|  2022 Playoffs
| style="|Bills 1–0| style="| Bills  34–31 
|
|  Dolphins  62–56–1
|  AFC Wild Card Round.
|-

|-
| AFL regular season
| style="|| Bills 3–1
| Dolphins 2–1–1
|
|-
| NFL regular season
| style="|| Bills 28–25 
| Dolphins 33–20
| Dolphins are 1–0 in Toronto (officially a Bills home game) 
|-
| AFL and NFL regular season
| style="|| Bills 31–26 
| 
| 
|-
| NFL postseason
| style="|| Bills 3–0
| Tie 1–1
| AFC Wild Card playoffs: 1995, 1998, 2022. AFC Divisional playoffs: 1990. AFC Championship Game: 1992.
|-
| Regular and postseason 
| style="|'''
| Bills 34–26 
| 
| 
|-

References

Buffalo Bills
Buffalo Bills rivalries
Miami Dolphins
Miami Dolphins rivalries
National Football League rivalries